Wangkui County is a county of western Heilongjiang province, People's Republic of China. It is under the jurisdiction of the prefecture-level city of Suihua.

Wankui in its Chinese name could be translated as Watch Kui. Kui represents the old name of QiqiHaer which is the second largest city in Heilongjiang province. Because the terrain of Wangkui is high, people in the past are able to watch Kui. And that is the why this little county is called Wang(Watch)kui.

One of the most famous cultural icon of this county is traditional Chinese barbecue. Two thirds of restaurants in this county would be a barbecue restaurant. Big stick with fat meat is no more popular here, locals appreciate small stick with small pieces of meat.

This county has four elementary schools and four secondary schools. It also has two high schools, No.1 High school and No.2 High school. Most students who want to have 'Gaokao' would choose to study at No.1 High school; and those who have talents about music and painting would go to No.2 High school.

Administrative divisions 
Wangkui County is divided into 4 subdistricts, 9 towns, 1 ethnic town, 3 townships and 2 ethnic townships. 
4 subdistricts
 Dongfeng, Qianjin, Dongsheng, Xing'an
9 towns
 Wangkui, Tongjiang, Weixing, Haifeng, Lianhua, Xianfeng, Yezi, Dongjiao, Dengta
1 ethnic town
 Huiqi Manchu
3 townships
 Housan, Dongsheng, Gongliu
2 ethnic townships
 Lingshan Manchu, Xiangbai Manchu

Demographics 

Climate

Notes and references 

Wangkui
Suihua